Zhao Mingyu (born 29 January 1997) is a Chinese footballer currently playing as a midfielder in China League One for Nanjing City.

Club career
Born in Wuhan, Hubei, Zhao Mingyu joined the Changchun Yatai youth academy at the age of 13 in 2010. Working his way through the various age groups, he made his professional debut with the club in a 3-1 Chinese Super League victory over Jiangsu Suning during the 2017 season.

Career statistics

Honours

Club
Changchun Yatai
 China League One: 2020

References

External links

1997 births
Living people
Chinese footballers
Association football forwards
Chinese Super League players
China League One players
Changchun Yatai F.C. players
Footballers from Wuhan